The 2021 Morgan State Bears football team represented Morgan State University as a member of the Mid-Eastern Athletic Conference (MEAC) in the 2021 NCAA Division I FCS football season. The Bears, led by second-year head coach Tyrone Wheatley, played their home games at Hughes Stadium.

Schedule

 Originally scheduled to be played as an away game, the game against Tulane was moved to Birmingham, Alabama on September 2, 2021, due to safety concerns related to Hurricane Ida. Tulane remained the designated home team despite the neutral site.

References

Morgan State
Morgan State Bears football seasons
Morgan State Bears football